Thanatsaran Samthonglai (also known as Frank, born 12 July 2000) is a Thai actor. He is known for his main role as Tee in 'Cause You're My Boy (2018), Bantad in Blacklist (2019) and Phukong in 2gether: The Series (2020).

Early life, education and career 
Thanatsaran was born in Loei Province, Thailand. He is currently taking up a vocational course on automotive at Panjavidhya Technological College.

In 2021, he left GMMTV after being required to serve in the military.

Personal life 
He owns a cat and eight dogs, five of which are shih tzu and rest are a pomeranian, a thai ridgeback and a bangkaew. He also likes to play football.

Filmography

Television

References

External links 
 
 
 

2000 births
Living people
Thanatsaran Samthonglai
Thanatsaran Samthonglai
Thanatsaran Samthonglai
Thanatsaran Samthonglai